Kaft-e Galeh Vari (also Romanized as Kaft-e Galeh Varī) is a village in Jastun Shah Rural District, Hati District, Lali County, Khuzestan Province, Iran. At the 2006 census, its population was 83, in 18 families.

References 

Populated places in Lali County